The Fushoushan Farm is a tourist attraction farm in Lishan Village, Heping District, Taichung, Taiwan.

History
The farm was originally established on 1 June 1957 when 100 Republic of China Armed Forces veterans were sent by Veterans Affairs Council to develop the area into an agricultural sitea.

Geology
The farm is located at an altitude of 1,800-2,580 meters above sea level and surrounded by mountains. It spreads over an area of 800 hectares. It features fruits, vegetables and flowers. It also features guest houses and camping area.

See also
 List of tourist attractions in Taiwan
 Agriculture in Taiwan

References

External links

 

1957 establishments in Taiwan
Buildings and structures completed in 1957
Farms in Taichung